Kingsbridge Road may refer to:

Kingsbridge Road (IRT Jerome Avenue Line), a New York City Subway station in the Bronx serving the  train
Kingsbridge Road (IND Concourse Line), a New York City Subway station in the Bronx serving the  trains